Inaba is a Japanese surname.

Inaba may also refer to:

 Inaba clan, a Japanese samurai clan
 Inaba Province, an old province of Japan in the area that is today the eastern part of Tottori Prefecture
 Mount Kinka (Gifu), previously named Mount Inaba
 Hare of Inaba, a Japanese myth
 Inaba, a Japanese long-distance sleeper train connecting Tokyo and Yonago that was discontinued in October 1978
 Inaba, a fictional town and setting for the video game Persona 4